KBO Futures League or Korea Baseball Futures League is South Korea's second level of baseball, below the KBO League. It serves as a farm league with the purpose to develop professional players on-demand to play in the KBO League. The league consists of two divisions — the Southern League and the Northern League. These leagues are governed by the Korea Baseball Organization (KBO). The league plays an 80-game season.

Current teams 
Most of the Korean minor league teams carry the same name, and use the same uniforms, as their parent team.

Southern League

Northern League

Non-regular team 
 Fukuoka SoftBank Hawks

History 
The KBO League was founded in 1982, with the second-tier league being founded in 1990. The initial roster of seven teams in the 1990 season was:
 Binggrae Eagles
 Haitai Tigers
 Lotte Giants
 LG Twins
 Ssangbangwool Raiders
 Samsung Lions
 Pacific Dolphins

The Ssangbangwool Raiders played the initial season in the Futures League; the team moved up to the KBO League in 1991 (although it left behind its minor-league team as well). The Raiders franchise was dissolved after the 1999 season.

The SK Wyverns added a minor-league franchise in 2001, playing their home games at SK Dream Park in the Nam District of Incheon. 

Two unaffiliated teams joined the minor leagues in 2005: the Korean Police Baseball Team, operated by the Seoul Metropolitan Police Agency, and the Sangmu Phoenix, part of the Korea Armed Forces Athletic Corps. Many KBO League players serving compulsory military service opted to play for the Police and Sangmu teams, usually for a term of two seasons.

The Hyundai Unicorns (formerly the Pacific Dolphins) — both the KBO League team and the second-tier team — were dissolved after the 2007 season.

The minor league's name was changed to the "Futures League" in 2008. That same year the Hwaseong Heroes joined the league.

In 2012, two teams based in Goyang joined the Futures League: the Goyang Dinos and the Goyang Wonders. (The Wonders' games were considered unofficially "friendly" contests.) Now with 11 teams, the Futures League divided into two divisions: the Northern League and the Southern League. A "Freedom Division" was also created for the Dinos and the Wonders. The Dinos only played the one season in the Futures League before being elevated to the KBO League — as the NC Dinos — prior to the 2013 season.

Also in 2012, the third-level squad of Nippon Professional Baseball's Fukuoka SoftBank Hawks, began playing 12 games a year against Futures League teams. 

The Suwon KT Wiz started out in 2013 as a Futures League team and played with Goyang Wonders in the Freedom Division; after two seasons the Wiz were elevated to the KBO (as the KT Wiz) in 2015. (The Goyang Wonders, meanwhile, were dissolved after the 2014 season.)

In 2015, the Futures League reorganized into three divisions: the Red League (Goyang Dinos, Hanwha Eagles, Hwaseong Heroes, SK Wyverns), the Blue League (Doosan Bears, LG Twins, Police, Suwon KT Wiz), and the Yellow League (Kia Tigers, Lotte Giants, Samsung Lions, Sangmu Phoenix). The 2015 Blue League champion was the Police Baseball Team; the Red League champion was the Goyang Dinos; and the Yellow League champion was the Sangmu Phoenix.

The league returned to the Northern and Southern League divisions in 2016.

The Sangmu Phoenix were champions of the Southern League in 2013, 2014, 2016, 2017, 2018, and 2019; the Police baseball team was the champion of the Northern League in 2012, 2013, 2014, 2016, 2017, and 2018. The Police team was disbanded after the 2019 Futures League season.

Former teams

See also 
 Baseball in South Korea
 Korea Baseball Organization
 KBO League
 All-Star Futures Game

Notes

References

External links 
 Korea Baseball Organization (KBO) - Official Website 

Future
Baseball leagues in Asia
KBO League
Sports leagues established in 1990
1990 establishments in South Korea
Professional sports leagues in South Korea